Andrew Goldberg may refer to:

Andrew Goldberg (director) (born 1968), American film producer/director
Andrew Goldberg (writer) (born 1978), American television writer
Andrew Goldberg (surgeon) (born 1970), British consultant orthopaedic surgeon
Andrew V. Goldberg (born 1960), American computer scientist

See also
Andreas Goldberger (born 1972), Austrian ski jumper